Sing Sinner Sing is a 1933 American pre-Code romantic drama film directed by Howard Christie.

Plot summary

Leila Hyams plays a singer who is accused of her husband's murder.

Production notes
At the time the movie was released, it was recognized as being loosely based on the 1932 Libby Holman-Zachary Smith Reynolds case.
According to Jeanne Scheper, other films inspired by "this episode of Holman's life include [...] Reckless (dir. Victor Fleming, 1935), with Jean Harlow; and Written on the Wind (dir. Douglas Sirk, 1956), with Lauren Bacall and Rock Hudson."

Cast
Paul Lukas as Phil Carida
Leila Hyams as Lela Larson
Don Dillaway as Ted Rendon
Ruth Donnelly as Maggie Flannigan
George E. Stone as Spats
Joyce Compton as Gwen
Jill Dennett as Sadie
Arthur Hoyt as Uncle Homer
Paul McGrail as Louis
Gladys Blake as Cecily Gordon
Arthur Housman as Jerry
Edgar Norton as Roberts the Butler
John St. Polis as James Parks
Stella Adams as Aunt Emily van Puyten
Pat O'Malley as Henchman Conley
Walter Brennan as Henchman Riordan

Various artists, such as Lionel Hampton and Marshal Royal, can be seen playing in bands in the film.

References

External links

1933 films
1933 romantic drama films
American black-and-white films
American romantic drama films
Majestic Pictures films
1930s American films